CSS New Orleans was a floating battery fitted out at New Orleans, Louisiana in 1861 and employed during the American Civil War. The craft featured two small boilers with pump connections for repelling boarders by drenching them with scalding water from her hoses. She was deployed under Lt. S. W. Averett, CSN, in the Mississippi River in time to assist joint army-navy operations at Island Number 10. and New Madrid, Missouri, from March 12 to April 7, 1862. On the final day of the Battle of Island Number Ten, the Confederates sank the New Orleans.

See also
 Blockade runners of the American Civil War
 List of ships of the Confederate States Navy

References
 

Ships of the Confederate States Navy
1861 ships
Shipwrecks of the American Civil War
Shipwrecks of the Mississippi River
Scuttled vessels
Maritime incidents in April 1862